Andohan'ilakaka is a commune in Madagascar. It belongs to the district of Ihosy, which is a part of Ihorombe Region. The population of the commune was 33,002 in 2018.

Primary and junior level secondary education are available in town. The majority 90% of the population of the commune are farmers, while an additional 10% receives their livelihood from raising livestock. The most important crop is rice: other important products are peanuts and cassava.

This commune has known a rapid growth due to the discovery of sapphires in the 1990s.

References

Populated places in Ihorombe
Sapphire mines in Madagascar